Cleeve Harper (born 24 December 2000) is a Canadian tennis player.

Harper has a career high ATP singles ranking of 1081 achieved on 14 November 2022. He also has a career high ATP doubles ranking of 702 achieved on 14 November 2022.

Harper made his ATP main draw debut at the 2022 National Bank Open after receiving a wildcard into the doubles main draw with Liam Draxl, but lost in straight sets to Simone Bolelli and Fabio Fognini.

Harper currently plays collegiate tennis at the University of Texas at Austin, where he recently won the 2022 NCAA Division I Men's Doubles Championship with teammate Richard Ciamarra.

ATP Challenger and ITF Futures/World Tennis Tour finals

Doubles: 3 (2–1)

References

External links
 
 

2000 births
Living people
Canadian male tennis players
Sportspeople from Calgary
Texas Longhorns men's tennis players
21st-century Canadian people